Fontenelle Reservoir is an artificial reservoir located in southwest Wyoming. It lies almost entirely within Lincoln County, although the east end of the Fontenelle Dam and a tiny portion of the reservoir are actually in northwestern Sweetwater County. Impounded by Fontenelle Dam, the reservoir acts primarily as a storage reservoir for the U.S. Bureau of Reclamation's Colorado River Storage Project, retaining Wyoming water in the state as a means of asserting Wyoming's water rights, with a secondary purpose of power generation. Water from Fontenelle Reservoir is used in local industries such as mining and power generation.  Although initially projected to provide irrigation  water for agriculture, the irrigation component was downgraded after difficulties with efficient irrigation in Wyoming's high semi-desert became apparent.

Plagued by chronic leakage problems at the dam, the reservoir was hurriedly emptied in 1965 and 1986 amid concerns about dam failure. The reservoir has facilities for recreation, with boat launching ramps and campgrounds. Fishing is available for brown, cutthroat and rainbow trout.

The land used for the Fontenelle Reservoir and dam was previously the Stepp Ranch, owned by one of the few black ranching families in Wyoming in the 1960s. The Stepps fought for their land in court, but ultimately lost. The land had been in the Stepp family since the turn of the 19th century. [4]

See also
 List of largest reservoirs of Wyoming
Black Pioneers, Images of the Black Experience on the North American Frontier

References

External links
 Fontenelle Dam at the U.S. Bureau of Reclamation
 Seedskadee Project at the U.S. Bureau of Reclamation
 Fontenelle Reservoir at recreation.gov

Lakes of Lincoln County, Wyoming
Reservoirs in Wyoming
Lakes of Sweetwater County, Wyoming
Colorado River Storage Project